La Bottine Souriante is a folk band from Canada. The band specializes in traditional French Canadian folk music, often with a modern twist.

Formed in 1976 by Yves Lambert, Andre Marchand, and Mario Forest, they have toured extensively through Europe and North America. In 1990, the band integrated a four-piece horn section with traditional instruments such as accordion, fiddle, guitar, piano and double bass, in order to add an element of jazz to their music. In 1998, they contributed a song to the Canadian Celtic music compilation by The Chieftains, Fire in the Kitchen.

The group's name means "the smiling boot", which refers to the appearance of a work boot with worn-out soles.

Members 
The line-up for LBS has changed numerous times (not unusual for folk groups), and its sound has evolved accordingly. The band started out with a very French Canadian feel with guitar, accordion and fiddle, but has expanded to include other styles and instruments.  Although founder Yves Lambert has left the group, LBS continues to perform, and a new wave of young musicians joined the group in 2002.

LBS's current line-up is:
 Éric Beaudry (vocals, guitar, bouzouki, mandolin, podorythmie) 2002-
 Pierre "Pedro" Bélisle (keyboards, piano accordion, piano, trumpet) 2000-
 David Boulanger (vocals, violin, podorythmie, percussion)2007-
 Benoît Bourque (accordion, bones, podorythmie, vocals) 2009-
 Robert "Bob" Ellis (bass trombone, tuba, percussion) 1990-
 Jean Fréchette (saxophone, flute, penny whistle, clarinet, percussion, vocals) 1990-
 Jean-François Gagnon-Branchaud (fiddle, guitar, voice) 2011-
 Jocelyn Lapointe (trumpet, flugelhorn) 1993-
 François Marion (electric bass, acoustic bass guitar)2007-
 Sandy Silva (percussive dance)
 André Verreault (trombone) 1990-

Past members include:
 Yves Lambert (accordion, jaw harp, harmonica, melodeon, (solo) vocals) 1976- 2002 (founding member)
 André Marchand (guitar, feet, (solo) vocals) 1976–1988 (founding member)
 Mario Forest (spoons, harmonica, vocals) 1976–1979, 1980–1984 (founding member)
 Gilles Cantin (guitar, feet, (solo) vocals) 1977–1981 (deceased)
 Jacques Landry (bones, bodhrán, fiddle) 1977
 Pierre Laporte (fiddle, (solo) vocals) 1977–1981
 Lisa Ornstein (piano, fiddle) 1979
 Guy Bouchard (spoons, guitar, fiddle, vocals) 1980
 Martin Racine (guitar, mandolin, feet, fiddle, vocals) 1980–1997
 Daniel Roy (flageolet, jaw harp, bones, bodhrán, (solo) vocals) 1982–1985
 Bernard Simard (guitar, (solo) vocals) 1984–1986
 Michel Bordeleau (snare drum, guitar, mandolin, feet, fiddle, (solo) vocals) 1987-2002
 Régent Archambault (double bass, electric bass, vocals) 1988-?
 Denis Fréchette (piano accordion, flugelhorn, piano, trumpet, vocals) 1988–1999 (deceased)
 Laflèche Doré (flugelhorn, trumpet) 1990–1993 (deceased)
 André Brunet (violin, guitar, vocals, podorythmie, percussion) 1997-2006
 Pierre-Luc Dupuis (vocals, accordion, harmonica) 2002-2008

Guest players

 Dominique D'Haiti (fiddle) on Je voudrais changer de chapeau
 Ron di Lauro (trumpet, flugelhorn) on La Mistrine
 Michel Dupire (percussion) on La Mistrine
 Jacques Landry (bodhrán, bones) on La traverse de l'Atlantique
 Danielle Martineau (piano) on La traverse de l'Atlantique
 Dominique Messier (drums) on La Mistrine
 Lisa Ornstein (fiddle, piano) on Les Épousailles, Chic & Swell and Je voudrais changer de chapeau
 Anne Perrot (cello) on Je voudrais changer de chapeau
 Daniel Plamondon (viola) on Je voudrais changer de chapeau
 Daniel Roy  (spoon) (bones) on Les Épousailles

Discography 
Albums
 Y'a ben du changement (1978) – (Gold)
 Les Épousailles (1980)
 Chic 'n Swell (1982)
 La Traversée de l'Atlantique (1986)
 Tout comme au jour de l'An (1987) – (Platinum)
 Je voudrais changer d'chapeau (1988)
 Jusqu'aux p'tites heures (1992) – (Platinum)
 La Mistrine (1994)
 En spectacle (1996)
 Xième (1998, also released in the United States as Rock 'n Reel) – (Gold)
 Cordial (2001)
 Anthologie (2001) – (Gold)
 J'ai jamais tant ri (2003)
 Anthologie II, 1976-2005 (2006)
  Appellation d'origine contrôlée (2011)
  danse (2019)

Contributing artist
 The Rough Guide to the Music of Canada (2005)

Awards and achievements 
La Bottine Souriante has received the Canadian Juno award for Best Roots & Traditional Album on three occasions for Je voudrais changer d'chapeau in 1989, Jusqu'aux p'tites heures in 1992, and Cordial in 2002. They have also received several Félix Awards from the Quebec recording industry:  four Best Folk Album of the Year awards for Jusqu'aux p'tites heures in 1992, La Mistrine in 1995, En spectacle in 1997, and Xième in 1999, two Best Traditional Album awards for Cordial in 2002 and J'ai jamais tant ri in 2004, and one Best Sound (Technical) of the Year award in 1993. Furthermore, they have received four gold records for Y'a ben du changement, En spectacle, Xième, and Anthologie and three platinum records for Tout comme au jour de l'An, Jusqu'aux p'tites heures, and La Mistrine.  They are known for their high energy live performances and in 2000 were voted Best Live Act at the BBC Radio 2 Folk Awards. BBC Radio 3 has also played their music in mainstream programmes.

See also 

Music of Canada
Music of Quebec
List of bands from Canada

References

External links 
 La Bottine Souriante Official web site
 Fan site – with details of lineup and pictures – in French
 Detailed discography – with some sound samples
 Song Lyrics - many complete album lyrics

Musical groups established in 1976
Musical groups from Quebec
Canadian folk music groups
Canadian Celtic music groups
Juno Award for Roots & Traditional Album of the Year – Group winners
1976 establishments in Quebec
Félix Award winners